Newton Dale is a narrow dale within the North York Moors National Park in North Yorkshire, England. It was created by meltwater from a glacier carving the narrow valley. Water still flows through the dale and is known as Pickering Beck.

The dale starts between Goathland Moor and Lockton High Moor where water runs southwards towards Pickering.

The dale is spelt either Newtondale or Newton Dale. Ordnance Survey maps and the North York Moors Railway refer to it as Newton Dale.

History
The dale was carved out by a massive amount of water charging through it in the last ice age. At the start of the twentieth century, Percy Kendall suggested that several massive glacial lakes at what is now the watershed between Eller Beck, the River Derwent and Pickering Beck effectively dammed the water and it was released at a torrent to carve the dale. It has been estimated that a few decades worth of water running through the dale carved it out, spilling the displaced earth into Lake Pickering. Kendall's original theory about massive pre-glacial lakes has been cast in doubt by modern research; many now believe that the ice sheets themselves just melted and released the water rather than the ice sheets holding back water in huge lakes.

Killing Nab Scar, a cliff face in the wood just to the north of Newton Dale railway station, was formerly a place where the farmers of Goathland were, according to the terms of their tenancy, obliged to breed, raise and train hawks for royal use.

The upper part of the dale was largely untouched by humans until the 1830s when the Whitby to Pickering Railway was built through it. However, the road between Pickering and Whitby used to go through Farwath and Levisham before it was diverted further east (now the A169).  The railway builders used bundles of wood, sheep fleeces and spoil to float the railway across Fen Bog.

At the head of the dale, where water either goes to Eller Beck (and then the Murk Esk then the River Esk) or Pickering Beck, is a bog (Fen Bog) which is managed by the Yorkshire Wildlife Trust. The area was gifted to the Yorkshire Wildlife Trust in 1964 in memory of two servicemen killed in the Second World War. The Lyke Wake Walk also crosses the bog.

The dale was designated as a Site of Special Scientific Interest in 1955 due to the varied plant and wildlife that it supports across wetland, woodland and bogland. Its glacial history is also a feature in the designation.

In 2015, a flood reservoir and over 160 leaky dams were built in the dale's lower reaches after Pickering was flooded four times between 1999 and 2007. The last flood caused £7 million worth of damage to the town.

Transport
There is no road access into the dale in its upper reaches, only parking at the fringes and walking in.

Up until 2011, there was a forest drive road between the villages of Levisham and Stape, but the Forestry Commission closed the route because of landslips, prohibitive repair costs and to preserve the ecology of the dale due to its SSSI status.

References

External links

Magic Map of the Newtondale SSSI

Valleys of the North York Moors